...Dawn+Dream II is a compilation album by the avant-garde/progressive death metal band Pan.Thy.Monium. The album consists of the band's only demo and EP, ...Dawn and Dream II, respectively. It was released on vinyl strictly limited to a one-time-only pressing of 500 hand-numbered copies. 250 sets were on 180 gram black vinyl and 250 sets on 180 gram gold vinyl. Included in all 500 copies is a 24" x 36" (60.96 cm x 91.44 cm) poster of the original Dream II Paw Nielsen cover artwork.

Track listing
"Dauwhnn" – 3:45
"Zenotaffph" – 3:14
"Klievieage" – 2:57
"Ekkhoeece" – 0:44
"I" – 4:26
"II" – 3:31
"III" – 3:46
"Vvoiiccheeces" – 1:29
"IV" – 5:47

Credits
Derelict aka Robert "Robban" Karlsson – vocals
Winter aka Benny Larsson – drums, percussion and violin
Day DiSyraah aka Dan Swanö – bass, keyboards and Effects
Mourning aka Robert Ivarsson – rhythm guitars
Äag aka Tom Nouga aka Dag Swanö - lead guitars, organ and baritone saxophone

References

Pan.Thy.Monium compilation albums
2010 compilation albums